Blood on the Slacks is the fourth full-length album by the American band Golden Smog. It was released by Lost Highway Records on April 24, 2007, less than a year after their previous album, Another Fine Day. The album's name is a play on Bob Dylan's 1975 album Blood On The Tracks. It was the first release from the group to not feature the Wilco frontman Jeff Tweedy as part of the lineup since 1992's On Golden Smog.

Reception

Writing for Allmusic, music critic Mark Deming praised Louris' song "Without a Struggle" and wrote of the album "Blood on the Slacks' pearly moments suggest these guys might be saving some of their top-shelf ideas for this band for a change, even if they didn't spend a lot of time sweating over the finished product."

Track listing
 "Can't Even Tie Your Own Shoes" (Kraig Jarret Johnson, Gary Louris, Dan Murphy) – 3:09
 "Starman" (David Bowie) – 4:42
 "Look At You Now" (Louris) – 3:04
 "Scotch on Ice" (Johnson, Louris, Murphy) – 3:14
 "Magician" (Johnson, David Pirner) – 1:20
 "Without a Struggle" (Louris, Murphy, Mark Perlman) – 3:14
 "Tarpit" (J Mascis) – 3:07
 "Insecure" (Murphy) – 3:03

Personnel 
 Gary Louris – vocals, background vocals, synthesizer, guitar, harmonica, piano, Glockenspiel, Mellotron
 Dan Murphy – vocals, background vocals, guitar, piano, slide guitar
 Kraig Jarret Johnson – vocals, background vocals, guitar, piano
 Marc Perlman – bass, percussion, conga, drums, tambourine, background vocals
 Ed Ackerson – percussion, background vocals
 Peter Anderson – drums, percussion, background vocals
 Muni Camón – vocals
 Jose Guillanot – trombone
 Miguel Ángel Muñoz – trumpet
 Linda Pitmon – drums
 Francis Salas – saxophone

Production notes 
 Ed Ackerson – producer, engineer, mixing
 Paco Loco – producer, engineer
 Richard Dodd – mastering
 John Fields – mixing
 Anna Marie Gabriel – art direction, design
 Jim Gavenus – photography
 Jennifer Turner – artwork
 Kim Buie – A&R

References 

2007 albums
Golden Smog albums
Lost Highway Records albums